Pseudischnolea kaszabi is a species of beetle in the family Cerambycidae, and the only species in the genus Pseudischnolea. It was described by Breuning in 1953.

References

Desmiphorini
Beetles described in 1953
Monotypic beetle genera